Stephen Scott may refer to:

Stephen Scott (composer) (1944–2021), American composer
Stephen Scott (cricketer) (born 1967), Zimbabwean cricketer
Stephen Scott (writer) (1948–2011), American Anabaptist writer
Stephen Scott (jazz pianist) (born 1969), American jazz pianist
Stephen Scott (rugby union) (1955–1994), New Zealand rugby union player
Stephen H. Scott (born 1964), Canadian neuroscientist
Stephen Allan Scott (born 1940), Canadian law professor
Steven Scott (born 1985), English sport shooter

See also
Steve Scott (disambiguation)